Saline is a village in southeastern Bienville Parish, Louisiana, United States. The population was 277 at the 2010 census. Saline is pronounced "Suh-LEEN".

Jamie Fair, a member of the Louisiana House of Representatives from 1980–1984, resides between Saline and Castor off Louisiana Highway 9.

Former Second Judicial District Court Judge David T. Caldwell, based in Jonesboro, was born in Saline and graduated from Saline High School in 1942.

A branch of Sabine State Bank operates in Saline.

Geography
Saline is located at  (32.164170, -92.977127).

According to the United States Census Bureau, the village has a total area of 1.2 square miles (3.1 km), all land.

The biggest attraction to Saline is the Mill Creek Reservoir. Usually misnamed as Saline Lake, it is the biggest, easiest to access and safest body of water in Bienville Parish. The waters are fairly deep and were long ago cleared of trees and tree stumps, making it ideal for boating, skiing, knee-boarding and other water activities. It has a ladder that goes to the top and some people climb it to jump off, but it is very unsafe and has claimed lives.

Churches and cemeteries
Saline has several Baptist congregations, including Old Saline Baptist, whose original pastor was George Washington Baines, maternal great-grandfather of U.S. President Lyndon B. Johnson. Within Saline is the Magnolia Baptist Church. Several miles east of Saline off Louisiana Highway 155 is Carolina Baptist Church. All three rural churches have accompanying cemeteries.

Demographics

As of the census of 2000, there were 296 people, 111 households, and 85 families residing in the village. The racial makeup of the village was 74.66% White, 25.00% African American, and 0.34% from two or more races. Hispanic or Latino of any race were 1.69% of the population.

There were 111 households, out of which 36.9% had children under the age of 18 living with them, 53.2% were married couples living together, 16.2% had a female householder with no husband present, and 23.4% were non-families. 23.4% of all households were made up of individuals, and 14.4% had someone living alone who was 65 years of age or older. The average household size was 2.67 and the average family size was 3.13.

In the village, the population was spread out, with 30.1% under the age of 18, 9.5% from 18 to 24, 25.0% from 25 to 44, 19.9% from 45 to 64, and 15.5% who were 65 years of age or older. The median age was 35 years. For every 100 females, there were 102.7 males. For every 100 females age 18 and over, there were 91.7 males.

The median income for a household in the village was $26,500, and the median income for a family was $31,250. Males had a median income of $26,458 versus $16,719 for females. The per capita income for the village was $11,364. About 17.3% of families and 21.9% of the population were below the poverty line, including 26.1% of those under the age of eighteen and 17.2% of those 65 or over.

Arts and culture
Like the larger Hope, Arkansas, Saline hosts a heavily attended Watermelon Festival each summer. The schedule of events includes a parade in which the Miss Watermelon Pageant winner rides on her own float. She is selected prior to the festival. A band plays mostly country music throughout the day, and dancing is available. Contests include watermelon eating, watermelon rolling, and seed spitting.

Media
A portion of Saline is featured in the film Blaze starring Paul Newman. The store from which Newman, as Earl Long, buys boots is an actual business in Saline. The year the movie was set for production coincided with Saline's largest ever Watermelon Festival, which included a petting zoo.

Education
Saline has one school, a modern structure that houses elementary, middle, and high school buildings.

Gallery

References

Villages in Louisiana
Villages in Bienville Parish, Louisiana